Chertsey is a town in the Borough of Runnymede, Surrey, England,  south-west of central London. It grew up round Chertsey Abbey, founded in 666 CE, and gained a market charter from Henry I. A bridge across the River Thames first appeared in the early 15th century. The River Bourne through the town meets the Thames at Weybridge. The Anglican church has a medieval tower and chancel roof. The 18th-century listed buildings include the current stone Chertsey Bridge and Botleys Mansion. A curfew bell, rung at 8 pm on weekdays from Michaelmas to Lady Day ties with the romantic local legend of Blanche Heriot, marked by a statue of her and the bell at Chertsey Bridge. Green areas include the Thames Path National Trail, Chertsey Meads and a round knoll (St Ann's Hill) with remains of a prehistoric hill fort known as Eldebury Hill. Pyrcroft House dates from the 18th century and Tara from the late 20th. Train services are run between Chertsey railway station and London Waterloo by South Western Railway. The town is within the M25, accessible via junction 11.

Toponymy
The first written mention of Chertsey is by Bede , in which he describes the location as Cerotaesei, id est Ceroti insula (translated as "Chertsey, that is the island of Cerotus"). The settlement appears in 13th-century copies of 7th-century charters as Cirotesige, Cirotesge and Cerotesge. The manor is recorded as Certesi in Domesday Book in 1086 and as Certeseye in 1129–30. Other later forms include Charteseye (mid-14th century), Charsey (in 1543) and Chutsey (in 1606). The first use of the modern spelling "Chertsey" is from 1559.

The first part of the toponym "Chertsey" is thought to refer to a Celtic individual, whose name was subsequently Latinised to Cerotus. The second part derives from the Old English ēg and means "island or well-watered land".

History

Chertsey is one of the oldest market towns in England. Its Church of England parish church dates to the 12th century (see below) and the farmhouse of the Hardwick in the elevated south-west is of 16th-century construction. It grew to all sides but the north around Chertsey Abbey, founded in 666 A.D. by Eorcenwald, Bishop of London, using a donation by Frithwald. Until the end of use of the hundreds, used in the feudal system until the establishment of Rural Districts and Urban District Councils, the name chosen for the wider Chertsey area hundred was Godley Hundred. In the 9th century, the Abbey and town were sacked by the Danes, leaving a mark today in the name of the neighbouring village, Thorpe, and refounded as a subsidiary abbey from Abingdon Abbey by King Edgar in 964.

Chertsey appears in the Domesday Book as Certesi. It was held partly by Chertsey Abbey and partly by Richard Sturmid from the abbey. Its Domesday assets were: 5 hides, 1 mill and 1 forge at the hall, 20 ploughs, 80 hectares of meadow, woodland worth 50 hogs. It rendered a larger than average sum for the book of manor and ecclesiastical parish entries, £22.

The Abbey grew to become one of the largest Benedictine abbeys in England, supported by large fiefs in the northwest corner of Sussex and Surrey until it was dissolved by Henry VIII in 1536. The King took stone from the Abbey to construct his palace at Oatlands Palace; the villagers also used stone for raising the streets. By the late 17th century, only some outer walls of the Abbey remained. During this period until at least 1911 a wider area was included in Chertsey: Ottershaw (and Brox) was an ecclesiastical district; whose church-sponsored (first built) schools were built in 1870, so too was Addlestone.

Today the history of the abbey is reflected in local place names and the surviving former fishponds that fill with water after heavy rain. The nearby Hardwick Court Farm, now much reduced in size and cut off from the town by the M25, has the successor to the abbey's large and well-supported 15th-century tithe barn, mostly rebuilt in the 17th century.

The eighteenth-century Chertsey Bridge provides an important cross-river link, and Chertsey Lock is a short distance above it on the opposite side. On the south west corner of the bridge is a bronze statue of local heroine Blanche Heriot striking the bell by Sheila MitchellFRBS.

The summit of St Ann's Hill in Chertsey was a vital viewing point for the Anglo-French Survey, which calculated the distance between the Royal Greenwich Observatory and the Paris Observatory using trigonometry. A grid of triangles was measured all the way to the French coast, to join up with the French survey; St Ann's Hill was crucial for the link with the base-line of the English survey on Hounslow Heath.

In the 18th century, Chertsey Cricket Club was one of the strongest in the country and beat the rest of England (excluding Hampshire) by more than an innings in 1778. The Duke of Dorset, (who played cricket for Chertsey), was appointed Ambassador to France in 1784. He arranged to have the Chertsey cricket team travel to France in 1789 to introduce cricket to the French nobility. However, the team, on arriving at Dover, met the Ambassador returning from France at the outset of the French Revolution and the opportunity was missed.

The original Chertsey railway station was built by the London and Southampton Railway and opened on 14 February 1848. The present station, across the level crossing from the site of the original one, was opened on 10 October 1866 by the London and South Western Railway. The Southern Railway completed electrification of the line on 3 January 1937.

Samuel Lewis devotes one of his longest entries to the small town in his 1848 topographical guide to England:

Chertsey Regatta has been held on the river for over 150 years, which is in the non-Olympic regional sport of skiffing which has a club on this reach of river. Similarly the Olympic sport of rowing (in racing shells) has an annual Burway Regatta above Chertsey Lock, an area of former flood meadow, reservoirs and golf course. The Burway faces Laleham Park, the largest municipal park of a neighbouring borough.

Chertsey was the home of Charles James Fox, who had wished to be buried there but instead is buried in Westminster Abbey. The nearby estate that is now the large Foxhills Golf Estate, Spa and Restaurant, close to Ottershaw and Lyne, was named in honour of him, but was not his home.

A long history of metal working exists, and from the 19th century a prosperous bell foundry, Eldridge, was in Windsor Street. Herrings, an iron foundry, flourished during the 19th century and was situated in Gogmore Lane.

The Chertsey troop of the Berkshire Yeomanry occupied the Drill Hall on Drill Hall Road since 1977. The unit has close ties with the borough and was granted the freedom of Runnymede in 2009. The Drill Hall closed at the end of March 2010 and the troop had to return to Windsor due to cuts in the Territorial Army in 2009–2010.

Geography

Location and topography

Chertsey is part of the London commuter belt in the outermost part of the Greater London Urban Area and is served by Chertsey railway station and separated from all adjoining settlements by the buffer of designated areas of Green Belt. The traditional, yet commercially important town centre is a conservation area, joined by an arcade to a medium-sized supermarket and car park to the south.

The character of this central area is that of a traditional small town, with relatively narrow building frontages set hard up against the pavement, so that they clearly define the public space. The centre of the town is richly endowed with listed buildings most of which date from the 16th and 17th Centuries. In addition to the more than 56 numbered houses/shops (42 buildings) nationally listed buildings, nine other buildings in the conservation area are locally listed. A further 11 buildings outside the centre are also nationally listed.

Elevation is generally low at 14m in the Town Centre and 11 m on the River Thames at Chertsey Bridge, making it the lowest place in Chertsey. The highest point is on the peak of wooded and inhabited St. Ann's Hill which reaches an elevation of 77 m, making it the second-highest point in Runnymede. Across Chertsey bridge, pictured, on the Middlesex side of the river is the Thames Path National Trail and Chertsey Lock.

Geology
Chertsey town centre lies on a floodplain terrace between the River Thames to the north and The Bourne to the south. Much of the terrace consists of river gravels deposited on the sandy Bagshot Beds, which in turn overlie the London Clay. The soil in this area is loamy and the water table is naturally high.

St Ann's Hill appears as an island of Tertiary strata, surrounded by river deposits. The hill is composed primarily of the Bagshot Beds, but is capped by Bracklesham Clays with a thick pebble bed. South west of the town centre, the chert and flint pebble deposits at Cockcrow Hill and Sandgates were probably deposited by an earlier course of The Bourne.

Economy
Aside from being a London "commuter town", Chertsey is home to the head office of Compass Group, and the UK head office and European headquarters of Samsung Electronics. Samsung moved there in 2005; previously the Samsung offices were in New Malden.

Thorpe Park, part of Merlin Entertainments Ltd, is on the northern boundary, connected by frequent buses from Staines-upon-Thames and Chertsey.

Landmarks

Chertsey Bridge
Chertsey Bridge is a Scheduled Ancient Monument and Grade II* listed structure that has a listed City (of London tax) Post at one end, and nearby milestones. It is predominantly of ashlar light stone with two white flagstone york stone pavements with a low weight limit and narrow carriageways inappropriate to HGVs, which have Staines Bridge, Walton Bridge or motorway alternatives to reach Spelthorne.

Samuel Lewis included it in his opening description of the town above: "...[River Thames] over which is a handsome stone bridge of seven arches, built in 1785, at an expense of £13,000, defrayed jointly by the counties of Surrey and Middlesex..." It was built in 1783–1785 by James Paine.

Museum
Chertsey has an admission-free museum on Windsor Street, which provides considerable information about the history of Chertsey.

The museum holds the Olive Matthews costume collection, which is of national importance, contains around three thousand pieces of costume and was donated by Matthews to the museum in 1969.

The museum contains clocks by two local makers, James Douglass and Henry Wale Cartwright. (Note however that there were three successive watchmakers called James Douglass (or Douglas) in the Douglas family, the latter based in Egham)

Hospital

St. Peter's Hospital, originally intended to serve casualties of the Second World War, formally came into being on 12 September 1939. It now has 400 beds and a wide range of acute care services, on the straight A road to Woking close to the much younger parish of Ottershaw. Hospital Radio Wey has been broadcasting to the patients and staff of St Peter's Hospital since 1965 and now also broadcasts on the internet as RadioWey.

St Peter's Church

St Peter's church has a 13th/14th-century west tower (with 18th-century bricks above the belfry) and east chancel; a collection of the Abbey's paving tiles is in its sanctuary; several are also in the British Museum and a 15th-century chancel roof. St Peter's is surrounded by many Grade II listed buildings in the three mixed shopping and residential streets of the town centre however is Grade II* listed building.

Curfew House and 25 Windsor Street
Curfew House is four narrow houses west of the church, a taller red brick building in a group of five buildings of the same era; the name derives from the cruel King John and Blanche Heriot history and story which took place in the town centre. Below an open pediment are brick pilasters with moulded wood cornice, with dentils. Brick-coped gable ends front the street. Enriched wood architrave features as part of its entrance door and reeded panels with raised centres. Its keystone is dated 1725, inside a Tympanum is inscribed: "c5 Founded by Sr Wm PERKINS KBE For Fifty Children clothed and taught Go and do likewise".

25 Windsor Street is also at Grade II* architecturally, early C18 however a larger three-storey house in brown brick with a tile roof, nipped. A moulded wood eaves cornice, altered, has supporting brackets. Five sash windows with bars make up the windows. A central entrance encased door has an open pediment in the Tuscan order with flat pilasters. Radial bars segment its arched fanlight. At the top floor is a stone moulded band; the middle floor band is also rendered; the ground floor band is lined and painted. Red gauged brick flat arches top the windows with window dressings and quoins. Its front railings have spearhead bars and metal standards with vases, gadrooned.

Pyrcroft House
Pyrcroft House on Pyrcroft Road leading to St Ann's Hill is a Grade II* listed building that was referenced by Nikolaus Pevsner and has a brick front with gauged flat arches to its windows, supplemented by square brick pilasters to the corners. Moulded brick cornice underlies a parapet (flat/almost flat) roof. Carved stone vases ornament the masonry in the corners; a band of rendering marks off the first floor. A large centre first floor window is arched with stone keystone and impost blocks, radial bars at its head. Other windows are all sash windows with bars; 12 paned. Its entrance door has a Regency period framing of its door. Wood panelling with subdued embellishment decorates the rooms.

Botley Park and Bournewood House

Owner Joseph Mawbey had architect Kenton Couse build this substantial Georgian building surrounded by a manicured estate, now a private nursing home. U-shaped it is a rectangle of three storeys with seven windows to each of the four fronts, built of ashlar its ground floor is rusticated with a modillion eaves cornice; a parapet roof tops the structure. Each front has three centre window bays that project slightly with a pediment above and their original glazing bars intact. Ground floor windows have keystones. Upper windows have moulded architraves, those on 1st floor with cornices over, the centre one with a pediment. On the north front, the centre projection has four engaged Ionic columns with a pediment above containing a cartouche flanked by swags of husks; a piano nobile to one side connects the middle floor with a doorway with a rectangular fanlight, approached by a horse-shoe shaped stair connected with doorway by a bridge, beneath which is the service entrance to the ground floor below. Two fronts are prolonged in the same style by large modern additions. Entrance has a good hall with screen of four Ionic columns and a high plaster ceiling. Other good ceilings and doorcases to principal rooms on 1st floor.

Bournewood House is part of Bournewood Park Hospital a central building in a large medical NHS trust adjoining St Peter's Hospital, formerly a nursing wing of the above hospital when it was run from the Victorian period as a mental hospital or asylum retreat.

Sport and leisure

Football
Chertsey has a Non-League football club, Chertsey Town F.C. who play at Alwyns Lane.

Chertsey Meads
Chertsey Meads adjoin a start of a southern variant of the Thames Path on the south bank from where the path crosses the river at Chertsey Bridge. On the north of this park is the main Thameside development, the Bridge Wharf estate, through which passes this strand of the Thames Path, the long northern border then follows the Thames towards Addlestone to the confluence, by private houses, on the south side of the River Bourne, Chertsey. Narrower parks and allotments, interspersed by relatively few developments, follow this brook upstream through the town centre, which rises a few miles above Virginia Water (the actual lake of the same name as the more recent settlement as a whole) to its north and south. Much of its upper catchment area still remains Crown Estate.

Nearby across Bridge Street by the bridge, to the north of this, is the Chertsey Camping and Caravanning Club Site There is another camping site at Laleham Park on the opposite bank of the Thames.

Annually, in early August, the Chertsey Agricultural Show is held here.

Great Cockcrow Railway
This 7.25" gauge miniature railway, off Hardwick Lane, opened in September 1968.

The Black Cherry Fair
This is an annual event on the 2nd Saturday of July each year with live music and refreshments.

Education
Schools in Chertsey include;
St Anne's Roman Catholic primary school
Salesian Catholic Secondary School (split site)
Pyrcroft Grange Primary (former split site)
Stepgates Community School
Sir William Perkins's School, independent girls' school established originally for boys and girls in 1725.
Chertsey High School (opened in 2017)

Chertsey High School

Chertsey High School is a non-faith school which welcomes children from different faiths and non-faith backgrounds, whilst maintaining strong Christian principles; the school ethos is Knowledge, Determination and Love. It opened in 2017 using the buildings that remained from the original Meads School, built in 1965. During a two-year occupancy, a new school building was developed alongside, opposite Clay Corner on the Chertsey Road. In 2019, the new school building opened its doors to 450 students, and has the capacity for 900 students over the coming years. The school has developed state-of-the-art facilities, including a 3G sports pitch, which it shares with its neighbours, Abbey Rangers Football Club.

Salesian School
The Salesian School is a state-funded, voluntary-aided Catholic comprehensive school with endowments for 1,200 pupils, located in Chertsey since the 1920s.

Religion

St. Anne's Church is a Catholic church in Eastworth road. St. Anne's School is a Catholic Primary school in Free Prae road. Salesian School is a Catholic Secondary school and Sixth Form College located in Guildford Road and Highfield Road respectively.
St. Peter's is a town-centre Anglican church with a range of ministries. Sunday worship is held at 9 am (traditional) and 10.30 am (contemporary).
Beacon Church is a Community Church based on Guildford Street in central Chertsey.
The International Community Church of Surrey, a non-denominational, international congregation, meets at Chertsey Hall each week.
Equippers Church is based at the Hub near Chertsey High School and meets each Sunday and in homes during the week.

Transport

Rail
Chertsey station is on the Chertsey branch line linking the Waterloo to Reading Line to the South West Main Line in Weybridge, all three currently operated by South Western Railway, benefiting from a level crossing and a road bridge sweeping north–south traffic around to the west of the town centre. Weybridge railway station is timetabled as 11 minutes away and the journey time to London Waterloo varies between 50 minutes to 66 minutes depending on choice of route.
Road
Scenic Chertsey Bridge was built in the 18th century, see above, this links to Shepperton. Chertsey is close to J11 of the M25 to two sides of the town (one exit bordering Ottershaw) and gives its name to the intersection of a main SSW motorway, the M3 with the M25 London Orbital Motorway.

In fiction and popular culture

Literary connections
Shakespeare's Richard III, Act I, Scene 2, mentions Chertsey as the burial place of Henry VI (Lady Anne: "Come now towards Chertsey with your holy load.")
Abraham Cowley, the 17th-century poet, lived in Chertsey after his return from exile. Abraham Cowley Mental Health Unit at St Peter's Hospital was named after him.
After the death of the father of Thomas Love Peacock, the future novelist and his mother lived with her father, Thomas Love, in Gogmoor Hall for about twelve years.
Charles Dickens while writing Oliver Twist (1838), visited Chertsey, where Twist is forced by Bill Sikes to take part in an attempted burglary.
Edward Lear makes reference to Chertsey in A Book of Nonsense:
There was an Old Lady of Chertsey,
Who made a remarkable curtsey;
She twirled round and round,
Till she sunk underground,
Which distressed all the people of Chertsey.
Albert Smith, born in Chertsey in 1816, wrote the play Blanche Heriot, or The Chertsey Curfew (1842) and the short story "Blanche Heriot: A Legend of Old Chertsey Church" (1843).
John Maddison Morton was living in Chertsey when he wrote Box and Cox (1847), which The New York Times in 1891 called "the best farce of the nineteenth century". It was the basis for F. C. Burnand's libretto for Arthur Sullivan's one-act comic opera Cox and Box (1866).
The poem "Curfew Must Not Ring Tonight", written in 1867 by the American Rose Hartwick Thorpe, was also based on the legend of Blanche Heriot.
H.G Wells's novel The War of the Worlds has Chertsey destroyed by Martian fighting-machines in the afternoon of 8 June 1902.
Antony Trew, naval officer and author of 17 novels and a volume of stories, died in Chertsey in 1996.
Jerome K. Jerome, in his "Three men in a boat", writes: "Harris and I wouid go down in the morning, and take the boat up to Chertsey, and George... would meet us there".

Television and film
The final series of the TV series Public Eye (1965–1975) was filmed in and around Chertsey.
The TV series Moving Wallpaper (2008–2009) was filmed and set in Chertsey.
Chertsey made a fleeting appearance in the 1964 classic film First Men in the Moon with the Old Town Hall standing in for Dymchurch Town Hall.
Other films partly shot in or around Chertsey include The Italian Job (1969), Scream and Scream Again (1970), The Dark Knight (2008) and One Chance (2013).
Portions of the music video for the Oasis song "Don't Go Away" were filmed in Chertsey in August, 1997.

Chertsey Panto 
The Chertsey Panto has been performed since 2012 in aid of local charities at The Crown public house in Chertsey.

Radio Wey 
Radio Wey is a hospital radio station, based at St. Peters Hospital in Chertsey, which also broadcasts to the local community. The station has been running since 1965, originally at Weybridge Hospital and then transferred to studios in the grounds of St. Peters Hospital in 1979.

Notable residents

 Richard Steere (1721) colonial American poet and merchant  born in Chertsey.
 Rev'd Peter Cunningham (1805) political poet and cleric  died in Chertsey.
 John Narrien (17821860) astronomer and author  born in Chertsey.
 Charles Cooper Henderson (18031877) painter  born at Abbey House, Chertsey.
 Albert Richard Smith (18161860) author, entertainer and mountaineer  born in Chertsey.
 Charlie Llewellyn (18761964) the first non-white South African Test cricketer  died in Chertsey.
 James Ottaway (19081999) actor  born in Chertsey.
 Leslie Lewis (19241986) Olympic track and field athlete  born in Chertsey.
 Keith Moon (19461978) drummer with the rock band The Who  lived at "Tara" on St Ann's Hill from 1971 to 1975.
 Mike Rutherford (b. 1950) guitarist and co-founder of the band Genesis  born in Chertsey.
 His Excellency Sir Ian Khama (b. 1953) President of Botswana 20082018  born in Chertsey.
 Vince Clarke (b. 1960) of pop bands Yazoo, Depeche Mode and Erasure  lived in Chertsey from 1990 to 2003 and recorded much of the Erasure material in the studio adjacent to his home.
 Sean Lock (19632021) comedian  born in Chertsey.
 Chesney Hawkes (b. 1971) singer and songwriter  lived in Chertsey.
 Ashley Giles (b. 1973) England cricketer  born in Chertsey.
 Richard Johnson (b. 1974) England cricketer  born in Chertsey.
 Tim Brabants (b. 1977) Olympic sprint kayaker  born in Chertsey.
 Robert Green (b. 1980) goalkeeper  was born in Chertsey.
 Harvey Elliott (b. 2003) Liverpool F.C. football player  born in Chertsey.

See also
Hardwick Court Farm, Chertsey, its former main manor.
Military Vehicles and Engineering Establishment (Later Defence Logistics Organisation (DLO) Chertsey. Defunct as of 2005.)
Chobham armour

Notes

References

Bibliography

External links

Chertsey Abbey
Chertsey Local History
History of Chertsey Abbey and St. Peter's Church

Chertsey Museum
The Olive Matthews Collection of Costume at Chertsey Museum
Embroideries, prints and weaves: a visit to Chertsey Museum, Surrey

Towns in Surrey
Populated places on the River Thames
Market towns in Surrey
Unparished areas in Surrey
Borough of Runnymede